Jacqueline Castel is an American-born French-Canadian film director, screenwriter, and curator based in New York City. Castel's work has screened at the Sundance Film Festival, South by Southwest, the Sitges Film Festival, and the International Film Festival Rotterdam, and she has written for and directed such established auteurs as John Carpenter and Jim Jarmusch, and has collaborated with David Lynch and Stella McCartney. She is the in-house director for the record label Sacred Bones Records, and has directed music videos for Zola Jesus, The Soft Moon, and Pharmakon.

In 2011, Fader magazine named Castel a "Video Director to Watch," and in 2012, she released early short film Twelve Dark Noons as the first film release on the Sacred Bones imprint, which premiered at South by Southwest. Castel's short film The Puppet Man world-premiered at the Sundance Film Festival in 2016 and featured the acting debut of fashion model Crystal Renn. Her 2014 short documentary 13 Torches For A Burn focused on the contemporary underground Danish music scene, and spotlighted the punk band Iceage. In 2016, Castel began work as director on the feature-length documentary A Message from the Temple, about Thee Temple Ov Psychick Youth, featuring English experimental singer and performance artist Genesis P-Orridge. She co-wrote an erotic thriller with Sasha Grey that Castel will be directing in Tokyo, and she directed supernatural drama My Animal, from a script written by Jae Matthews of electronic group Boy Harsher.

Music videos
Castel has directed the following:

References

External links
 

Year of birth missing (living people)
Living people
21st-century Canadian women writers
Canadian film directors
21st-century Canadian screenwriters
Canadian women film directors
Canadian women screenwriters